Karl Patrick Lauk (born 9 January 1997 in Kuressaare) is an Estonian cyclist, who currently rides for UCI ProTeam .

Major results

2016
 5th Time trial, National Road Championships
2017
 1st  Overall Tour of Estonia
1st  Points classification
1st  Young rider classification
1st Stage 1
 National Road Championships
5th Time trial
5th Road race
2018
 1st  Mountains classification, Tour of Estonia
 National Road Championships
3rd Road race
4th Time trial
2019
 1st Stage 4 Rhône-Alpes Isère Tour
 National Road Championships
2nd Time trial
5th Road race
 4th Grand Prix de la ville de Nogent-sur-Oise
 6th L'Etoile d'Or
2020
 2nd Road race, National Road Championships
2021
 1st  Overall Tour of Estonia
1st Stage 1
 1st Stage 3 International Tour of Rhodes
 1st Grand Prix de la ville de Nogent-sur-Oise
 1st Stage 7 Tour de la Guadeloupe
 2nd Overall Baltic Chain Tour
1st Stage 2
2022
 4th Overall ZLM Tour
2023
 1st Stage 6 La Tropicale Amissa Bongo

References

External links

1997 births
Living people
Estonian male cyclists
Sportspeople from Kuressaare
European Games competitors for Estonia
Cyclists at the 2019 European Games